The 2012–13 Scottish Football League First Division, also known as the 2012–13 Irn Bru Scottish Football League First Division for sponsorship reasons, was the 18th season of the Scottish Football League First Division and the 107th season of a second-tier football league in Scotland. Partick Thistle were confirmed as 2012–13 champions, on 20 April following their 2-0 win over Falkirk. This was the final season of the First Division under its then format, as it was replaced by the Scottish Championship from the 2013–14 season onwards.

Teams
Ross County were promoted to the Scottish Premier League as champions, while Dunfermline Athletic were relegated from the SPL to this division.

Two sides were relegated from this division at the end of the 2011–12 season. Queen of the South, who finished bottom, and Ayr United in the play-offs. They were replaced by Second Division champions Cowdenbeath, and Dumbarton as winners of the promotion play-offs.

On 13 July, Rangers were admitted to the Third Division after being voted out of the SPL. As a result, the playoff losing finalist Airdrie United were promoted to the First Division to fill the gap caused by Dundee replacing Rangers in the SPL.

Stadia and Locations

Personnel and kits

League table

Results
Teams play each other four times in this league. In the first half of the season each team plays every other team twice (home and away) and then do the same in the second half of the season, for a total of 36 games.

First half of season

Second half of season

Play-offs
Times are BST (UTC+1)

Semi-finals
The fourth placed team in the Second Division (Forfar Athletic) played the ninth placed team in the First Division (Dunfermline Athletic) and the third placed team in the Second Division (Brechin City) played the second placed team in the Second Division (Alloa Athletic). The play-offs were played over two legs, the winning team in each semi-final advancing to the final.

First legs

Second legs

Final
The two semi-final winners played each other over two legs.  The winning team was awarded a place in the 2013–14 First Division.

First leg

Second leg

References

Scottish First Division seasons
1
2012–13 in Scottish football leagues
Scot